Salesian College, is an independent Roman Catholic day school in Farnborough, Hampshire, England. It admits boys from the age of 11 to 18, and girls in the Sixth Form. The College was founded in 1901 as a small preparatory school for boys, but soon expanded to provide secondary education owing to its increasing popularity.

For the 2007–08 academic year, the College announced that it would admit girls into the Sixth Form for the first time. The college has a strong record of academic achievement, with a 100% pass rate at GCSE in 2015, and 99.5% at A Level.

History
In 1901, Bishop Cahill of the Diocese of Portsmouth invited the Salesians of Battersea to take over the orphanage, a former tin factory, in Queen's Road, Farnborough. This marked the beginning of the Salesians' work in education in the local area and as a parish.

By 1902 a reporter in Sheldrakes Military Gazette noted that the thirty 'poor Catholic waifs and those sons of sore stricken Roman Catholic parents' had a home 'comfortable in every respect', and were learning trades to prepare them for life's struggles.

Under previous Headmaster, Mr Wilson, the College witnessed substantial structural growth, the most significant being the erection of the Sean Devereux Sixth Form Centre providing facilities for girls, and new classrooms built equipped with improved technology.

The College maintains links with the nearby Alton Convent School and often organises joint activities and events together, such as the yearly Lower Sixth trip to Tregoyd and the Senior College Prom.

The most recent addition to the college is the renovation of the old music school. The process began during the 2012–2013 academic year and the new Father Brendan McGuinness Music Building was completed and officially opened in September 2013. It is named in honour of the college's former chaplain who has a long-standing affiliation with the college, lasting over half a century.

The College's entrance examination currently consists of tests in Mathematics, Verbal Reasoning, English and a written task sat by boys in year 6.

HCPT's Annual Pilgrimage to Lourdes

Every Easter, boys and girls from the Lower Sixth go on the HCPT Pilgrimage to Lourdes. In the past, students from Poland and Romania have joined the students from Salesian College. However, the trip would not take place in 2020 due to COVID-19.

Notable former pupils

 Steve Backshall, naturalist, writer and television presenter
 Daniel Boys, musical theatre actor
 Sean Devereux, a Salesian missionary and aid-worker assassinated in Kismayu, Somalia in 1993 while working for UNICEF. There is a stained-glass window to commemorate Devereux's life and work in the College Chapel.
 Jeremy Metcalfe, racing driver
 Matthew Phillips, World Champion Paraclimber
 Richard Ratcliffe, the husband of Nazanin Zaghari-Ratcliffe
 Alastair Stewart, journalist and presenter
 Phil Taylor, England international rugby player
 Harvey Dixon, middle-distance runner

Farnborough Old Salesians Association
The Farnborough Old Salesians Association (OSA) is a society for former pupils who wish to contact other Old Boys. It has its foundations in the 1920s, with its first formal meeting held in 1927. The association has organised whole-year reunions. The association aims to provide all of its Old Boys around the world with information on other Old Boys, on events at the College, and on the OSA's activities.

For those Old Boys who live locally, the OSA organises activities throughout the year, such as a Remembrance Mass in November, OSA soccer matches and the soccer tour, OSA golf days and the golf tour, the Annual Reunion and AGM (two weeks after Easter), a presence at the College's Garden Fete, as well as funding OSA Prizes at Prizegiving. The OSA regularly assists the Salesian family in various local undertaking and around the world by activity or financial aid. The OSA maintains links with the wider Salesian family by means of the Salesian Past Pupils UK and Ex Allievi di Don Bosco.

In the 1970s the OSA donated a marble tablet in commemoration of the Old Boys who gave their lives in the Second World War. The tablet shows the OSA (at that time the Salesian Old Boys Association Farnborough) badge and the motto "Salesian Old Boys Let not the glory fade away Keep bright the flame of memory and honour them 1939–1945."

Headmasters
1983–1997: Br Michael Delmer
1997–2014: Patrick A. Wilson
2014–present: Gerard Owens

See also

Bishopric of the Forces
Cathedral of St Michael and St George, Aldershot
Dominic Savio
John Bosco
Francis de Sales
Patronage of the Blessed Virgin Mary
Roman Catholic Diocese of Portsmouth
Salesians of Don Bosco

References

External links
Salesian College, Farnborough, Hampshire, ISC
Salesian College, Farnborough, Official Website
Salesian College, Library Website

Salesian secondary schools
Boys' schools in Hampshire
Private schools in Hampshire
Roman Catholic private schools in the Diocese of Portsmouth
Educational institutions established in 1901
1901 establishments in England
Farnborough, Hampshire
Member schools of the Independent Schools Association (UK)